Ukraine competed at the 2013 World Games in Cali, Colombia, from 25 July 2013 to 4 August 2013. Ukraine qualified a team in men's beach handball.

Medalists

Main programme

Invitational sports

External links 
 2013 World Games official site
 Ukraine at the 2013 World Games

Nations at the 2013 World Games
2013 in Ukrainian sport
2013